Adriana Irma Pesci is an Argentine applied mathematician and mathematical physicist at the University of Cambridge, specialising in fluid dynamics. Her research topics have included lattice models of polymer solutions, Hele-Shaw flow, flagellar motion of organisms in fluids, soap films on Möbius strips, and the Leidenfrost effect.

Education and career
Pesci is originally from Argentina, and earned her Ph.D. in 1986 at the National University of La Plata in Argentina. She was a postdoctoral researcher at the University of Chicago, under the mentorship of Leo Kadanoff and Norman Lebovitz.

She joined the University of Arizona as a lecturer in physics in 1999, becoming a senior lecturer in 2003. In 2007 she moved to the University of Cambridge, where she is a senior research associate in the Department of Applied Mathematics and Theoretical Physics, a fellow of King's College, and a former Darley Fellow in Mathematics of Downing College.

Personal life
Pesci married Raymond E. Goldstein, a frequent coauthor who was also a postdoctoral researcher in Chicago and moved with her to Arizona and Cambridge.

Selected publications

References

Year of birth missing (living people)
Living people
Argentine mathematicians
Argentine women mathematicians
Argentine physicists
Argentine women physicists
Fluid dynamicists
National University of La Plata alumni
University of Arizona faculty
Fellows of King's College, Cambridge
Fellows of Downing College, Cambridge